Edvin Lönnberg (13 March 1885 – 5 January 1934) was a Finnish rower. He competed in the men's coxed four event at the 1912 Summer Olympics.

References

1885 births
1934 deaths
Finnish male rowers
Olympic rowers of Finland
Rowers at the 1912 Summer Olympics
Sportspeople from Helsinki